Slay Duggee is an English heavy metal band for children. They play 'My First Metal Gig' concerts to give kids their first experience of live heavy metal music.

History 
Slay Duggee formed in January 2018 to release a heavy metal version of "The Stick Song" from "The Stick Badge" episode of Hey Duggee. The Slay Duggee version was released within 48 hours of the original being broadcast, and was featured on UK radio shortly afterwards. DJ Steve Lamacq, of BBC Radio 6 Music, has described them as "the Lords of Toddler Metal".

In 2018, Slay Duggee collaborated with guitarist James Monteith from Tesseract, and singer Nicky “Scorpion” Calonne from Nekrogoblikon, on a cover version of "Everything Is Awesome" from The Lego Movie. In the same year, Slay Duggee released a Christmas single "Walking in the Air" with singer Daniel Tompkins from Tesseract. In July 2018, the band completed a successful Kickstarter campaign to fund the album Kids Love Metal.

Slay Duggee released their debut album Kids Love Metal in 2018. The album was partially funded by selling wooden sticks on Kickstarter.

Slay Duggee released their second album My First Metal Album in 2019. Featuring heavy metal cover versions of songs such as "Paw Patrol", "PJ Masks", "You've Got A Friend In Me", "Sleeping Bunnies", "Johny Johny (Yes Papa)" and "Daddy Finger".

In 2020, to replace a fundraiser concert cancelled due to COVID19, the band filled Hot Box Live, Chelmsford, UK, with 35,000 ball crawl balls to play a special livestream concert to an audience of one, Angus Grocott, a young quadrelegic fan.

Slay Duggee released their third album Chinese Dogmocracy in 2022. Featuring heavy metal cover versions of songs such as "Spongebob Squarepants (featuring Rachel Aspe from Cage Fight)", "Bluey", "There's A Party In My Tummy", "Toothbrushing Song", "Round and Round The Garden (featuring Princess Beast from Animal Schoolbus)" and a song "Surfin'" written by, and featuring 4-year-old fan Reuben.

Steve Lamacq had Slay Duggee live in session on his BBC Radio 6 Music radio show in August 2019. Steve performed guest duck quacks on the song "Sarah & Duck".

In August 2019, their first live gig 'My First Metal Gig' at Craufurd Arms, Milton Keynes sold out within two hours.

Slay Duggee played a farewell concert at Colchester Arts Centre in November 2022.

References 

2018 establishments in the United Kingdom
British heavy metal musical groups
British children's musical groups